Stephen Coronel (born March 21, 1951) is an American guitarist and former member of the rock band Wicked Lester. He co-wrote a handful of songs that would later be recorded by the group Kiss, a band which featured former Wicked Lester members Paul Stanley and Gene Simmons. In 2014, Coronel was charged with possessing child pornography, and has been incarcerated at Kershaw Correctional Institution in South Carolina since 2016.

Musical career 
A veteran of several New York City-area bands such as The Long Island Sounds, Bullfrog Bheer (with Gene Simmons), Tree (with Paul Stanley), Cathedral, Coffee, and Rainbow (unrelated to the Ritchie Blackmore band of the same name), Coronel introduced Stanley to Gene Simmons at his Washington Heights apartment in the early 1970s. The trio would go on to form Wicked Lester, which later morphed into Kiss when Simmons and Stanley decided to move in a new musical direction. Not involved in the formation of Kiss, Coronel formed the band Lover. While still a member of Wicked Lester in the early 1970s, Coronel created the riff and chord structures of future Kiss songs "She" and "Goin' Blind" with Simmons.

Sexual exploitation conviction 
Coronel was arrested on September 26, 2014, and charged with five counts of sexual exploitation of a minor. A U.S. Department of Justice Internet Crimes Against Children Task Force investigation determined that child pornography had been uploaded from a residence in Bluffton, South Carolina.

Coronel was sentenced to six years in prison on April 27, 2016, after being found guilty of third-degree sexual exploitation of a minor. As of April 2018, he was incarcerated at the Kershaw Correctional Institution in South Carolina.

Coronel was released from prison, placed on probation March 3, 2019, and transferred to South Carolina's Beaufort County Detention Center, where he is choosing to stay while awaiting approval to move to Florida.

References

External links 
Legendary Rock Interviews interview with Steve Coronel by John Parks
Kiss army Spain interview with Steve Coronel by Javier Rueda and Fernando Martínez

Kiss (band) personnel
Living people
American rock guitarists
American male guitarists
1951 births
20th-century American guitarists
People from Manhattan
People from Bluffton, Ohio
American people convicted of child pornography offenses
Guitarists from Ohio